Pirates is a British children's television sitcom about a family of pirates whose ship runs aground in North London, and they decide to live in a council house on Wordsworth Terrace, located in the same area. The series ran from 1994 to 1997 on Children's BBC.

Characters

Main 

 Hayley Elliott as Lambkin Bones, Roger's daughter. She is a fun-loving sassy tomboy who has a secret underneath her tough exterior – she doesn't like the sea.
 Paul Bown as Roger Bones. A single father who is the patriarch of the family. He has a slightly sarcastic personality, and cannot co-ordinate things to achieve what he wants.
 Liz Smith as Gran, Roger's eccentric mother-in-law. Considering herself "a pirate and a half", she is a dab hand with a blunderbuss, and isn't afraid to fight hard. As the family's cook, her speciality is "mince pies made of squirmy things".
 Benjamin Rennis as Lawrence Kitten, a preteen streetwise boy who lives next door to the Bones family. Although he is often bemused by the family's antics, he and Lambkin are good friends.
 Rebecca Stevens as Grog Blossom Kate, one of Gran's old pirate crew from many years ago, who joins the Bones family when Gran herself invites her for a get-together. She sometimes clashes with Roger, who does not get on very well with her.

Minor characters

 Pustule the Macaw, Gran's pet macaw.
 Toby Sedgwick as The Man in the Sack. He is member of the Bones family whose identity is unknown, as his whole body is obscured by a sack.
 Andrew Sachs as Mr. Jones, Kittens' other next door neighbour, who leads a secret double life as the pirate Basmati Bill.
 Baby Bones, The youngest member of the Bones family, who is never seen, but his presence is often noted by a green glow coming out of his black pram.

Episodes

Series 1

Series 2

Series 3

References

External links

BBC children's television shows
BBC television sitcoms
1990s British children's television series
1994 British television series debuts
1997 British television series endings
Television series about pirates